Raas may refer to:

Places
 Raas (It. Rasa), a village in the municipality of Natz-Schabs, South Tyrol, Italy
 Raas Island, an island and district of East Java, Indonesia
 South Caribbean Coast Autonomous Region, formerly the South Atlantic Autonomous Region (Región Autónoma del Atlántico Sur), an autonomous region of Nicaragua

Science and technology 
 Renin–angiotensin system, also known as the renin–angiotensin–aldosterone system, a hormone system that helps regulate long-term blood pressure and blood volume in the body
 Recovery as a service
 Robot as a service
 Runway Awareness and Advisory System, an airplane avionics system to improve flight crew situational awareness when operating at airports

Other uses
 Raas (surname)
 Dandiya Raas, a folk dance from the Indian state of Gujarat, often associated with Garba
 Rasa lila, also known as Raas Leela, a traditional Indian dance

See also
 Rasa (disambiguation)
 Raaz (disambiguation)